Zaikin is a Russian surname meaning literally "stutterer's (son)". Notable people with the surname include:
Aleksandr Vladimirovich Zaikin (born 1988), Russian footballer
Aleksandr Yevgenyevich Zaikin (born 1974), Russian footballer
Dmitri Zaikin (1932-2013), Russian cosmonaut trainer

Russian-language surnames